Wilder Andrés Medina Tamayo (born 21 February 1981) is a retired Colombian footballer.

Club career
In 1999, while playing for the youth academy of Deportivo Rionegro, he received a sanction for a positive drug test. 

In May 2011, Medina received a three-month suspension for testing positive for marijuana. During the period where he was suspended, he submitted to rehab for addiction. A few months later, in September 2011, Medina received a one-year doping ban and a $2.8 million USD (5.35 million COL) fine stemming from positive drug tests.

Medina played until 2013 for clubs in Colombia: Deportivo Rionegro in 2003, Atlético Huila in 2004, Envigado in 2005, Patriotas of Primera B in 2006-2007, where he was top scorer, and was transferred to Deportes Tolima, where he scored the 3000th goal of the club's history.

During the Apertura 2013, Wilder Medina played with Independiente Santa Fe and scored lots of goals, including the one he scored against Grêmio for the knockout stages of the Copa Libertadores, where he also earned the man of the match. With Santa Fe he scored 16 goals, 12 in the league and four in the Copa Libertadores.

Medina was acquired by Barcelona Sporting Club and made his debut on August 1, 2013 in the Copa Sudamericana match against Atlético Club Mineros de Guayana.

Honours 
Santa Fe
 Categoría Primera A (1): 2014–II
 Superliga Colombiana (1): 2013

References

External links

1981 births
Living people
Sportspeople from Antioquia Department
Colombian footballers
Categoría Primera A players
Categoría Primera B players
Leones F.C. footballers
Atlético Huila footballers
Envigado F.C. players
Patriotas Boyacá footballers
Deportes Tolima footballers
Independiente Santa Fe footballers
Barcelona S.C. footballers
Real Cartagena footballers
Colombian expatriate footballers
Expatriate footballers in Ecuador
Expatriate footballers in Bolivia
Doping cases in association football
Colombian sportspeople in doping cases
Association football forwards